Endgame is a BBC Books original novel written by Terrance Dicks and based on the long-running British science fiction television series Doctor Who. It features the Eighth Doctor, as well as the Players.

External links
The Cloister Library – Endgame

2000 British novels
2000 science fiction novels
Eighth Doctor Adventures
Fiction about amnesia